Automobile Alley or Automobile Alley Historic District may refer to:

Automobile Alley Historic District (Mobile, Alabama), a historic district listed on the National Register of Historic Places (NRHP) in the United States
Automobile Alley (Oklahoma City, Oklahoma), a NRHP-listed neighborhood

See also
Auto row, a business cluster with multiple car dealerships in a single neighborhood or road
Automotive Historic District, a NRHP in Birmingham, Alabama